Weekend Hussler is a retired Australian Thoroughbred racehorse. He is a bay gelding by Hussonet out of Weekend Beauty (by Helissio). He was foaled in 2004. Hussonet had been a very successful sire in Chile for Haras de Pirque where he stood for the largest fee of any stallion in the history of Chilean Thoroughbred breeding.

Weekend Hussler won 9 of his 11 starts at three, including Group One wins in the Caulfield Guineas, Ascot Vale Stakes, Oakleigh Plate, Newmarket Handicap, Randwick Guineas and George Ryder Stakes.  In winning six Group One wins he equalled Kingston Town's Australian record for most in a single season. Weekend Hussler was named the 2007/2008 Australian Horse of the Year.

His first start as a four-year-old resulted in a second placing to the unbeaten Group One winner Light Fantastic in the J J Liston Stakes. Two weeks later he backed it up with his first win in the 2008–09 season by winning the Memsie Stakes at Caulfield Racecourse, defeating Maldivian and Pompeii Ruler. A week later in the Makybe Diva Stakes (formerly the Craiglee Stakes) he won again, by 2½ lengths over Zarita and Littorio. In that event Light Fantastic suffered his first defeat to run fourth. Two weeks later, Weekend Hussler won his seventh Group One when victorious in the Underwood Stakes at Caulfield over 1,800 metres, his first race past 1,600 metres. Two weeks later, he finished eighth in the Turnbull Stakes at Flemington Racecourse in his first attempt at 2,000 metres. Weekend Hussler then finished twelfth behind the British racehorse All The Good in the Caulfield Cup. His first run as an autumn four-year-old resulted in a fourth in the Lightning Stakes, his second run resulted in a fifth in the Australia Stakes. Injury concerns curtailed his four-year-old campaign and kept him out of racing during the spring as a five-year-old.

He returned to racing in February 2010 in the Oakleigh Plate, where he finished back in the field under the top-weight. Another injury (a torn off synovial pad from his off fore fetlock joint) was found after that race, and he was to miss the rest of the autumn. He returned to racing in October 2010 with a 10th placing in the Gilgai Stakes at Flemington; however, his retirement was announced shortly after.

Race record

Pedigree

References

 Victory in Newmarket Handicap
 Horse of the Year Award
 Weekend Hussler's pedigree and racing statistics

2004 racehorse births
Australian Champion Racehorse of the Year
Racehorses bred in Australia
Racehorses trained in Australia
Thoroughbred family 9-h